The 2000 Esiliiga is the tenth season of the Esiliiga, second-highest Estonian league for association football clubs, since its establishment in 1992.

Final table

Promotion playoff

FC Kuressaare were awarded the playoff win after JK Tervis Pärnu withdrew due to unavailability of players active for the Estonian U-18 team. Kuressaare remained in Meistriliiga, Tervis in Esiliiga.

Relegation playoff

See also
 2000 Meistriliiga
 2000 in Estonian football

Esiliiga seasons
2
Estonia
Estonia